A constitutional coup occurs when a person or group seizes political power in a way consistent with their country's constitution, as opposed to a traditional violent coup d'état, often by exploiting loopholes or ambiguities in said constitution. Supporters of constitutional coups exploit their political power to semi-legally seize more. Constitutional coups can be carried out in many ways, including removing term or age limits, changing electoral rules to hinder opposing candidates, and postponing elections indefinitely. 

Constitutional coups are often facilitated by weak democratic institutions and an absence of "democratic culture" within countries. Struggles between rival factions, particularly between ethnocultural or religious groups, are a common facilitator of constitutional coups. Constitutional coups often involve willing and participatory parliaments and changes to term limits are often accompanied by other constitutional changes which are meant to weaken political opposition and ensure election victories. These coups are considered a relatively recent occurrence in global democracies.

Examples

In Africa 

In Africa, constitutional coups typically entail the expansion of executive power through the extension or elimination of constitutional term limits. Another common strategy is for an incumbent to invalidate the candidacy of their opponent, making themselves the de facto winner. As many as 30 African heads of state have attempted to extend their mandates through constitutional changes since the early 1990s, when many African countries began democratizing.

African heads of state have developed a preference for constitutional coups over military coups, in part, because they are less likely to anger foreign aid partners. In addition, there are greater safeguards against traditional coups, incentivizing political leaders to hold on to power through constitutional coups instead. For example, the African Union and its predecessor, the Organization of African Unity, have developed effective policies to deal with military coups, but have so far been ineffective at discouraging constitutional coups. Documents published by the AU/OAU to create a framework for intervention after coups, including the Lomé Declaration, the African Charter on Democracy, Elections and Government, and the Constitutive Act of African Union, only consider unconstitutional regime change, not constitutional coups.

Many African Presidents have changed their country's constitutions to extend their term-limits. These include Presidents Gnassingbé (Togo), Museveni (Uganda), Déby (Chad), Biya (Cameroon), Kagame (Rwanda), Nkurunziza (Burundi), and el-Sisi (Egypt).

In 2005, the president of Burkina Faso, Blaise Compaoré, exploited a quirk of the 1991 constitution to stay in power after he had expended the term limits. Compaoré argued that, because he was elected to office before term limits were first instituted in 2000, they did not apply to him. The Constitutional Council of Burkina Faso, which was controlled by Compoaré and his political party, the Congress for Democracy and Progress, ruled in his favor. Compaoré then ran for and won a third term in office.

Pakistan, 1953 

Governor-General Ghulam Mohammad dismissed Pakistani Prime Minister Khawaja Nazimuddin's government in 1953 despite the Prime Minister enjoying the support of the Constituent Assembly and, subsequently, dismissed Pakistan's first constituent assembly in 1954.

Malaysia, 1976 
On April 15, the Bersatu Rakyat Jelata Sabah (Berjaya - Sabah People's United Front) was victorious in the state elections over the ruling Sabah Alliance party by persuading dissent members of the Sabah Alliance party to abandon their leader, Tun Mustapha bin Datu Harun.

Tunisia, 1987 
On November 7, the Prime Minister of Tunisia, Zine el-Abidine Ben Ali, deposed the president for life, Habib Bourguiba, and assumed the position of chief executive.

United States, 2000 

During the United States presidential election debacle in Florida, then-governor Jeb Bush called on the state legislature to simply ignore the contested vote count and give Florida's electoral college votes to candidate George Bush, a fellow Republican and Jeb Bush's brother. This is theoretically constitutional, as the US constitution does not guarantee the right to vote in presidential elections. Rather, it authorizes each state to determine how its electors should be chosen, although it is ambiguous whether, having already selected electors by vote in accordance with state law, the legislature can then overrule that determination. However, the move was ultimately blocked by the US Supreme Court.

The Supreme Court striking down a constitutional coup may seem like a contradiction in terms, as the coup no longer seems constitutional, per se. However, it is important to note that the "constitutional" element of constitutional coups refers more to the exploitation of ambiguity within democratic rule of law, not a truly legal process. This ambiguity, combined with enough political power, allows anti-democratic seizures of power to occur under the guise of constitutionality.

Nepal, 2020 
Khadha Prasad Sharma Oli, Prime Minister of Nepal, had attempted to dissolve the Nepalese parliament. The dissolution was being challenged under three different petitions in the Supreme Court, and it was contested whether or not the Prime Minister actually has the power to dissolve parliament. K P Oli attempted the power grab in the during a legitimacy crisis, as rival factions seek his resignation due to poor governance and authoritarian impulses.

References

Authoritarianism
Political history
Democratization
Coups d'état
Constitutional crises
International relations
Politics of Africa